Van Hoorn is a Dutch toponymic surname. The place of origin often is the city of Hoorn in North Holland, but may be any of four other Dutch settlements named Hoorn, three named Den Hoorn, or Horn/the county of Horne in Dutch Limburg. Notable people with the surname include:

Andries van Hoorn (1600–aft.1660), Dutch mayor of Haarlem portrayed by Frans Hals
Arnold II van Hoorn, misspelling of Arnold van Horne (1339–1389), Dutch bishop 
Hugoline van Hoorn (born 1970), Dutch squash player
Joan van Hoorn (1653–1711), Dutch Governor-General of the Dutch East Indie 1704–09
Netty van Hoorn (born 1951), Dutch film director
Nicholas van Hoorn (1635–1683), Dutch pirate
Nicolaas van Hoorn (1904–1946), Dutch olympic fencer
Graaf van Hoorn may refer to Philip de Montmorency, Count of Horn
 (born 1968), née van Hoorn, Franco-Dutch writer

See also
't Wapen van Hoorn, a 17th-century Dutch East India Company sailing ship
Van Horne (disambiguation)
Van Horn (disambiguation)
Van der Hoorn, Dutch surname

References

Dutch-language surnames
Surnames of Dutch origin
Toponymic surnames